Charles Rumford Walker, Jr. (July 31, 1894 – November 26, 1974) was an American historian, political scientist, and novelist. He specialized in the study of the history of the industrial worker.

Biography
Walker was the son of Francis Sheafe and Charles Rumford Walker, Sr. born at Concord, New Hampshire. He graduated from Yale University in 1916, and served in the United States Army during World War I.

He was associate editor of Atlantic Monthly (1922–1923), The Independent (1924–1925), and The Bookman (1928–29). One of his most notable books was American City: Rank and File View (1937). He also wrote Steel: The Diary of a Furnace Worker and a novel entitled Bread and Fire: A Novel.

He died on November 26, 1974.

References

External links
 
 
Minnesota Historical Society biography
Library Thing entry

1890s births
20th-century American novelists
American political scientists
1974 deaths
American magazine editors
The Atlantic (magazine) people
Yale University alumni
American male novelists
20th-century American male writers
20th-century American non-fiction writers
American male non-fiction writers
20th-century political scientists